Small Planet Airlines s.r.l., also known as Small Planet Airlines Italia, was an Italian charter airline with its headquarters in Fiumicino, Rome and bases at Leonardo da Vinci-Fiumicino Airport (Rome) and Il Caravaggio International Airport. It began as a subsidiary of the also now defunct Small Planet Airlines from Lithuania. On 17 January 2014 the airline ceased all operations.

History 
The airline is no longer related with its founder, Small Planet Airlines from Lithuania anymore as it was sold to Aeroservizi and Avia Solutions Group in April 2013. The company got its license revoked as of 17 January 2014 stating financial difficulties. It ceased all flights accordingly.

Destinations 
The airline operated some charter flights for the Italian flag carrier Alitalia, and scheduled and charter flights for the Italian virtual airline Flyplanet.

Fleet 
The Small Planet Airlines fleet consisted of the following aircraft (as of June 2013):

References

External links
 

Defunct airlines of Italy
Airlines established in 2010
Airlines disestablished in 2014
2010 establishments in Italy
Italian companies disestablished in 2014
Defunct charter airlines